Korsträsk IK is a sports club in Korsträsk, Sweden.

The women's soccer team played three seasons in the Swedish top division between 1979–1981.

References

External links
Official website 
Idrott online

Football clubs in Norrbotten County
Sport in Norrbotten County